"Higher (Free)" is a song by British band All About She. It was released on 2 December 2013. The song entered the UK Singles Chart at number twenty on the week ending 14 December 2013.

Music video
A music video to accompany the release of "Higher (Free)" was first released onto YouTube on 4 October 2013 at a total length of four minutes and eleven seconds. The video was directed by James Barber.

Track listing

Credits and personnel
 Vocals – Vanya Taylor
 Lyrics – Vanya Taylor, Alahna Dressekie, James Tadgell, John Clare
 Producer – James Tadgell & John Clare
 Label – Disturbing London

Chart performance

Weekly charts

References

2013 songs
2013 singles
UK garage songs